Ezzatabad (also Romanized as ‘Ezzatābād) is a village in Shalil Rural District, Miankuh District, Ardal County, Chaharmahal and Bakhtiari Province, Iran. At the 2006 census, its population was 548 over 99 families. The village is populated by Lurs.

References 

Populated places in Ardal County
Luri settlements in Chaharmahal and Bakhtiari Province